Boraqchin may refer to:

 Boraqchin (wife of Ögedei)
 Boraqchin (Tatar), wife of Batu Khan and regent for Ulaghchi
 Boraqchin Agachi, a wife of Hulagu Khan